Stenandrium hirsutum is a plant native to the Cerrado vegetation of Brazil. The description of the plant was published in Flora Brasiliensis in 1847.

References

External links
  Flora Brasiliensis: Stenandrium hirsutum

hirsutum
Flora of Brazil
Plants described in 1847